Telangana State Electricity Regulatory Commission (TSERC)  is a governing body to control certain regulatory and safety functions related to the power sector in the Indian state of Telangana.

History
Consequent to the formation of Telangana State, Telangana State Electricity Regulatory Commission (TSERC) was constituted on 3 November 2014. It was incorporated under the Electricity Regulatory Commission Act, 1998, of Central Act in August 1999. In 2003, Under Section 82 of the Electricity Act the commission is continued as regulatory body in state.

Functions
 To improve the functionality of the power sector in the state of Telangana to make it viable and with prime focus of protecting the interests of the consumers.
 To promote competition, efficiency and economy in the power sector.
 To regulate tariffs of power generation, transmission and distribution in Telangana.
 To facilitate intrastate transmission and wheeling of electricity.
To ensure transparency while exercising its powers and discharging its functions.

See also
Telangana State Southern Power Distribution Company Limited
Telangana State Northern Power Distribution Company Limited
Power Generation
Transmission Corporation of Telangana

References

State agencies of Telangana
Energy in Telangana
Regulatory agencies of India
State electricity agencies of India
Electric power in India
Electricity authorities
Indian companies established in 2014
Energy companies established in 2014
2014 establishments in Telangana